Nanchen Road is a station on Shanghai Metro Line 7. It began operation on December 5, 2009. The station serves Shanghai University's Baoshan campus.

Railway stations in Shanghai
Shanghai Metro stations in Baoshan District
Railway stations in China opened in 2009
Line 7, Shanghai Metro